The Seac Pai Van Park is a park in Coloane, Macau, China. It is the largest natural green area in Macau and is administered by the Civil and Municipal Affairs Bureau.

History
The area was originally a farmland. It was then later converted into a multipurpose park. In 1981, it was listed as a protected area.

Geology

Attractions
 Macao Giant Panda Pavilion
 Natural and Agrarian Museum

See also
 List of tourist attractions in Macau

References

Parks in Macau
Coloane